John Richard Markell (born March 10, 1956) is a Canadian ice hockey coach and former professional player. Markell played 55 games in the National Hockey League and later coached Ohio State University.

Born in Cornwall, Ontario, Markell attended Bowling Green State University, where he was a four-year letter winner and served as an assistant captain as a senior on the Falcon hockey team that went 37-6-2.  He was BG's leading scorer as a junior with 61 points after leading the team in goals as a sophomore with 26.  Markell finished his career with 235 points, including 102 career goals.  He also had 133 career assists.  Markell was voted BG's outstanding forward in 1978 and 1979. After going undrafted, Markell played 55 National Hockey League games: 52 with the Winnipeg Jets, two with the St. Louis Blues and one with the Minnesota North Stars. In his NHL career, Markell scored 11 goals and 10 assists.

Markell served as the head coach of the Ohio State University ice hockey team from 1995 until the end of the 2009-10 season. The seventh Buckeye head coach, he led the team to the NCAA tournament six times, marking the only appearances in program history, with an NCAA Frozen Four appearance in 1998.

Career statistics

Regular season and playoffs

Head coaching record

College

† Markell assumed the head coaching position when Jerry Welsh resigned midseason.

Awards and honours

References

External links

1956 births
Living people
Bowling Green Falcons men's ice hockey players
Canadian expatriate ice hockey players in the United States
Canadian ice hockey right wingers
Cornwall Royals (QMJHL) players
Dallas Stars scouts
Grizzlys Wolfsburg players
Ice hockey people from Ontario
Minnesota North Stars players
Montana Magic players
Ohio State Buckeyes men's ice hockey coaches
Rote Teufel Bad Nauheim players
St. Louis Blues players
Salt Lake Golden Eagles (CHL) players
Sportspeople from Cornwall, Ontario
Springfield Indians players
Tulsa Oilers (1964–1984) players
Undrafted National Hockey League players
Winnipeg Jets (1979–1996) players